The 1948–49 Cupa României was the 12th edition of Romania's most prestigious football cup competition.

The title was won by CSCA București against CSU Cluj.

Format
The competition is an annual knockout tournament.

In the first round proper, two pots are made, the first pot with Divizia A teams and other teams till 16 and the second pot with the rest of teams qualified in this phase. First-pot teams will play away. Each tie is played as a single leg.

In the first round proper, if a match is drawn after 90 minutes, the game goes in extra time, and if the score is still tied after 120 minutes, the team from the lower league will qualify.

In the rest of the rounds, if a match is drawn after 90 minutes, the game goes in extra time, and if the score is still tied after 120 minutes, the team who plays away will qualify.

In case the teams are from same city, a replay will be played.

In case the teams play in the final, a replay will be played.

From the first edition, the teams from Divizia A entered in competition in sixteen finals, rule which remained till today.

First round proper

|colspan=3 style="background-color:#FFCCCC;"|3 September 1949

|-
|colspan=3 style="background-color:#FFCCCC;"|4 September 1949

|}

Second round proper

|colspan=3 style="background-color:#FFCCCC;"|16 October 1949

|-
|colspan=3 style="background-color:#FFCCCC;"|19 October 1949

|-
|colspan=3 style="background-color:#FFCCCC;"|25 October 1949

|-
|colspan=3 style="background-color:#FFCCCC;"|3 November 1949

|-
|colspan=3 style="background-color:#FFCCCC;"|6 November 1949

|}

Quarter-finals 

|colspan=3 style="background-color:#FFCCCC;"|5 November 1949

|-
|colspan=3 style="background-color:#FFCCCC;"|6 November 1949

|-
|colspan=3 style="background-color:#FFCCCC;"|11 December 1949

|}

Semi-finals

|colspan=3 style="background-color:#FFCCCC;"|11 December 1949

|-
|colspan=3 style="background-color:#FFCCCC;"|15 December 1949

|}

Final

References

External links
 romaniansoccer.ro
 Official site

Cupa României seasons
Cupa Romaniei
Romania